Do Dilon Ki Dastaan is a 1985 Indian Bollywood romance film directed by A. C. Tirulokchandar. It stars Sanjay Dutt and Padmini Kolhapure in pivotal roles.

Cast
 Sanjay Dutt as Vijay Kumar Saxena
 Padmini Kolhapure as Sona Mathur
 Kajal Kiran as Aarti Verma
 Shakti Kapoor as Shekhar
 Om Prakash as Mr. Saxena
 Arun Govil as Kamal

Soundtrack
Lyrics: Anjaan

References

External links

1980s Hindi-language films
1985 romantic drama films
1985 films
Films directed by A. C. Tirulokchandar
Films scored by Laxmikant–Pyarelal
Indian romantic drama films